Coleophora falcipenella is a moth of the family Coleophoridae. It is found in Yunnan, China.

The wingspan is about 15 mm.

References

falcipenella
Moths described in 1989
Moths of Asia